William Kenneth Ashwood (born 16 January 1958) was a Scottish footballer who played for East Stirlingshire, Falkirk, Dumbarton, Ayr United, Airdrie and Queen of the South.

References

1958 births
Scottish footballers
Dumbarton F.C. players
Falkirk F.C. players
East Stirlingshire F.C. players
Ayr United F.C. players
Airdrieonians F.C. (1878) players
Queen of the South F.C. players
Scottish Football League players
Living people
People from Baillieston
Association football outside forwards